Eduardo Toda y Güell (9 January 1852, in Reus – 26 April 1941, in Reus) was a Spanish diplomat, historian, Egyptologist and numismatist.

Career 
After studying law at the Central University of Madrid, Eduardo was appointed Vice-Consul in Macao, Hong Kong, Canton, and Shanghai.

He was subsequently Consul General in Cairo, Egypt (1884-1886) and became friends with Gaston Maspero. During his post, he became very interested in ancient Egypt and while at Deir el-Medina, he discovered and opened the intact tomb of Sennedjem.

After being posted to Helsinki and Le Havre, he decided to abandon his diplomatic career and move to London. He didn't return to Spain until 1918 where he created the collection  and later tried to establish a school of Egyptology. After being unsuccessful in his attempts, he moved to the  where he devoted himself to the history of the Poblet Abbey.

He became professor at the School of Librarians of the Provincial Diputación of Barcelona, Corresponding Member of the Catalan Studies Institute and Member of the Reial Acadèmia de Bones Lletres de Barcelona. He presented his personal library to several Catalan institutions where he gave his Numismatic collection to the Archivo Histórico Nacional in Madrid, his Egyptian collection to the National Archaeological Museum of Spain, and the Biblioteca Museu Víctor Balaguer in Vilanova i la Geltru.

Publications 
 Macao (Recorts de viatje), 1877
 "Annam and its minor currency", 1882
 Poblet. Recorts de la Conca de Barberá, 1883
 Sesostris, 1886
 La Vida en el Celeste Imperio, 1887
 La Muerte en el Antiguo Egipto, 1887
 Son Notem en Tebas :  Inventario y textos de un sepulcro egipcio en la XX dinastía, 1887
 Catálogo de la Colección Egipcia de la Biblioteca-Museo Balaguer, 1887
 A través el Egipto, 1889
 Translation of George Rawlinson's work, Historia del Antiguo Egipto, 1894

Biographical information 
 F. Valls Taberner, "Necrología. Eduardo Toda y Güell", Hispania no.4, 1941, pp. 123–128.
 J. Padró, "Édouard Toda, diplomate espagnol, érudit catalan et égyptologue du XIXe siècle", in Bulletin de la Société française d'égyptologie no.113, octobre 1988, pp. 34–41.
 Ève Gran-Aymerich, "Les Chercheurs de passé", éditions du CNRS, 2007, pp. 1195–1196.
 Mònica GINÉS BLASI, "Eduard Toda i Güell: From Vice-Consul of Spain in China to the Renaixença in Barcelona (1871-84)", ENTREMONS. Journal of World History (Universitat Pompeu Fabra Barcelona) Número 5 (juny 2013).

Spanish diplomats
20th-century Spanish historians
Spanish Egyptologists
1852 births
1941 deaths
19th-century Spanish historians